Mannheim is a station on Metra's Milwaukee District West Line in Franklin Park, Illinois that gets services during rush hour as a flag stop. In Metra's zone-based fare system, Mannheim is in zone C. As of 2018, Mannheim is the 218th busiest of Metra's 236 non-downtown stations, with an average of 35 weekday boardings. The reason this station is named because of Mannheim Road running right next to it. It is the only non-ADA-accessible station on the Milwaukee District West Line. The Tri-State Tollway also runs adjacent to the Mannheim station.

As of December 12, 2022, Mannheim is served as a flag stop by 12 trains (eight inbound, four outbound) on weekdays only.

Mannheim station is little more than a wooden shelter, which is smaller than  further east. The station lies on the south side of Front Street between Lincoln and Ernst Streets. Parking is available on the north side of Front Street along the same block. It is just east of the large Canadian Pacific Bensenville Yard, which sits to the south of O'Hare International Airport.

This station originally served as a milk stop for the village of Mannheim, Illinois. Mannheim was founded in the 1870s when the railroad was built through the area and was later annexed into Franklin Park.

Bus connections
Pace

References

External links 

Station from Google Maps Street View
Railroad History of Franklin Park

Metra stations in Illinois
Former Chicago, Milwaukee, St. Paul and Pacific Railroad stations
Franklin Park, Illinois
Railway stations in Cook County, Illinois
Railway stations in the United States opened in 1873